Luis Granda (born 22 July 1955) is an Ecuadorian footballer. He played in 21 matches for the Ecuador national football team from 1977 to 1983. He was also part of Ecuador's squad for the 1979 Copa América tournament.

References

External links
 

1955 births
Living people
Ecuadorian footballers
Footballers from Quito
Ecuador international footballers
Association football midfielders